France competed at the 1988 Winter Olympics in Calgary, Alberta, Canada. Frank Piccard won France's first Winter Olympic gold medal for 20 years.

As Albertville would be hosting the following Winter Olympics, a brief French segment was performed at the closing ceremony.

Medalists

Competitors
The following is the list of number of competitors in the Games.

Alpine skiing

Men

Men's combined

Women

Women's combined

Biathlon

Men

Men's 4 x 7.5 km relay

 1 A penalty loop of 150 metres had to be skied per missed target.
 2 One minute added per missed target.

Cross-country skiing

Men

 C = Classical style, F = Freestyle

Men's 4 × 10 km relay

Figure skating

Men

Women

Ice Dancing

Ice hockey

Group A
Top three teams (shaded ones) entered the medal round.

Sweden 13-2 France
Finland 10-1 France
Poland 6-2 France*
Canada 9-5 France
Switzerland 9-0 France

* The Polish team was stripped of its victory after Jarosław Morawiecki tested positive for testosterone. France was recorded as having a 2-nil win, but received no points in the standings.

Game for 11th place

|}

Team roster
 Jean-Marc Djian
 Patrick Foliot
 Daniel Maric
 Stéphane Botteri
 Michel Leblanc
 Jean-Philippe Lemoine
 Jean-Christophe Lerondeau
 François Ouimet
 Denis Perez
 Pierre Schmitt
 Steven Woodburn
 Peter Almasy
 Paulin Bordeleau
 Philippe Bozon
 Guy Dupuis
 Derek Haas
 Stéphane Lessard
 Franck Pajonkowski
 André Peloffy
 Christian Pouget
 Pierre Pousse
 Antoine Richer
 Christophe Ville
 Head coach: Unknown

Luge

Women

Nordic combined 

Men's individual

Events:
 normal hill ski jumping 
 15 km cross-country skiing 

Men's Team

Three participants per team.

Events:
 normal hill ski jumping 
 10 km cross-country skiing

Ski jumping

Speed skating

Men

Women

Demonstration sports

Curling 
 Catherine Lefebvre
 Annick Mercier
 Agnès Mercier
 Andrée Dupont-Roc

References 

 Official Olympic Reports
 International Olympic Committee results database
 Olympic Winter Games 1988, full results by sports-reference.com

Nations at the 1988 Winter Olympics
1988
Winter Olympics